The 2018 Philippine Basketball Association (PBA) Commissioner's Cup Finals was the best-of-7 championship series of the 2018 PBA Commissioner's Cup and the conclusion of the conference's playoffs. The Barangay Ginebra San Miguel and the San Miguel Beermen competed for the 18th Commissioner's Cup championship and the 123rd overall championship contested by the league.

This was the sixth Finals match-up between the two teams, with the Beermen winning four of the first five series. They last met during the 2016–17 Philippine Cup Finals which the Beermen won, 4–1. Barangay Ginebra's sole series win came during the 2007 Philippine Cup Finals.

The series highlighted the match-up between former PBA Best Player of the Conference (2017 Governors') and 4-time All-Star Greg Slaughter and 4-time MVP June Mar Fajardo, arguably two of the best centers in recent PBA history, who last faced each other in a finals series during their college days in CESAFI in 2009, which Slaughter's University of Visayas won. The series also featured the match-up between the PBA Best Import of the Conference award front-runners Justin Brownlee and Renaldo Balkman, who won a title as teammates with the San Miguel Alab Pilipinas of the ABL three months back.

Background

Barangay Ginebra San Miguel
This was Barangay Ginebra's fourth Commissioner's Cup Finals and 25th overall. They last appeared in a Comm's Cup Finals in 2013, with their last Commissioner's Cup title coming in 1997.

San Miguel Beermen
This was the Beermen's 40th Finals appearance, who won all of their six previous Finals in the last ten conferences. This was their sixth Commissioner's Cup Finals appearance, and was the defending champion entering the series having won the previous year's series.

Road to the finals

Head-to-head matchup

Series summary

Game summaries

Game 1

Entering the game, Barangay Ginebra won 10 of their last 11 games and had the momentum to start strong in the series. They got into a fast start, leading by 15 in the first quarter and 19 after the half. Import Justin Brownlee was red-hot, having scored 29 points at halftime, with 18 coming in the first period. The Beemen tried to stage a comeback in the second half and was trailing by 19 after three quarters. However, Barangay Ginebra started the last period with a 25–5 run for a 39-point advantage, 119–80, the largest of the game. They never looked backed and dealt the Beermen their worst loss of the conference. Chris Ross tweaked his ankle in the fourth quarter and had to head to the locker room. After the game, he confirmed that he will be able to play in Game 2.

Brownlee led the Gin Kings with 42 points, 7 rebounds and 9 assists on 17-for-19 shooting and had support from the locals, with 4 other players scoring in double figures led by Joe Devance who had 22 points. For the Beermen, import Renaldo Balkman scored 27 points and top rookie Christian Standhardinger added 26, with four-time MVP June Mar Fajardo registering a double-double with 13 points and 12 rebounds.

Ginebra shot 62 percent from the field and shot 13-for-25 from the arc. San Miguel only shot 39% and was 7-for-29 from 3. Ginebra also registered 37 assists. During the third quarter, Devance scored his 500th 3-point field goal made. He was the 41st PBA player and 19th among active players to reach that milestone.

Game 2

Game 3

Game 4

Game 5

Game 6

Rosters

{| class="toccolours" style="font-size: 95%; width: 100%;"
|-
! colspan="2" style="background-color: #; color: #; text-align: center;" | Barangay Ginebra San Miguel 2018 PBA Commissioner's Cup roster
|- style="background-color:#FDD501; color: #; text-align: center;"
! Players !! Coaches
|-
| valign="top" |
{| class="sortable" style="background:transparent; margin:0px; width:100%;"
! Pos. !! # !! POB !! Name !! Height !! Weight !! !! College 
|-

  Chua also serves as Barangay Ginebra's board governor.

{| class="toccolours" style="font-size: 95%; width: 100%;"
|-
! colspan="2" style="background-color: #; color: #; text-align: center;" | San Miguel Beermen 2018 PBA Commissioner's Cup roster
|- style="background-color:#; color: #; text-align: center;"
! Players !! Coaches
|-
| valign="top" |
{| class="sortable" style="background:transparent; margin:0px; width:100%;"
! Pos. !! # !! POB !! Name !! Height !! Weight !! !! College
|-

Broadcast notes
The 2018 Commissioner's Cup Finals was on TV5 with simulcasts on PBA Rush (both in standard and high definition). TV5's radio arm, Radyo5 provided the radio play-by-play coverage. 

ESPN5 provided online livestreaming via their official YouTube account using the TV5 feed.

The PBA Rush broadcast provided English-language coverage of the Finals.

Additional Game 6 crew:
Trophy presentation: James Velasquez
Dugout celebration interviewer: Apple David

References

External links
PBA official website

2018
2017–18 PBA season
Barangay Ginebra San Miguel games
San Miguel Beermen games
PBA Commissioner's Cup Finals
PBA Commissioner's Cup Finals